The homes for votes scandal was a gerrymandering controversy involving the Conservative-led Westminster City Council in London. In marginal wards, the Council was starting to move the homeless elsewhere, and sell off council homes to groups who were more likely to vote Conservative. On investigation, the policy was ruled to be illegal, and it was revealed that some of the homeless had been rehoused in condemned accommodation. Former leader of the Council Dame Shirley Porter was found guilty of wilful misconduct and ordered to repay £36.1m. In view of her personal circumstances, a payment of £12.3 million was eventually accepted.

Background
The Conservatives were narrowly re-elected to Westminster City Council in the 1986 local council elections, with their majority reduced from 26 to 4. The Conservatives in total only held onto control of the council by 106 votes after Labour failed to gain the marginal Cavendish Ward which was needed to give Labour the majority to take control of the council. Following the election and fearing that they would eventually lose control unless there was a permanent change in the social composition of the borough, council leader Shirley Porter instituted a secret policy known as 'Building Stable Communities', focusing on eight marginal wards where the Conservatives wished to gain votes at the 1990 local council elections.

Implementation of the policy
Eight wards were selected as 'key'. Secret documents showed that these were chosen for being the most marginal in the local election of 1986. Three: Bayswater, Maida Vale and Millbank had been narrowly won by Labour. St. James's, Victoria and Cavendish narrowly returned Conservatives. West End returned one non-Tory, an Independent. Hamilton Terrace saw its Conservative councillors electorally squeezed by the SDP.

In these wards much of Westminster's council housing was slowly renovated and advertised for open-market sale, rather than re-letting when each unit became vacant.  Much of this designated housing lay vacant for months or even years before sale. To prevent its occupation by squatters or drug dealers, these flats were fitted with security doors (installed and serviced by a major contractor at £50 per week per door).

A second semi-secretive strategy was the removal of homeless voters and others who lived in hostels and were perceived as less likely to vote Conservative, such as students and nurses, from Westminster. While this initially proved successful, other councils in London and the Home Counties soon became aware of homeless individuals and families from Westminster, many with complex mental health and addiction problems, making an unusual proportion of calls on services in their area. In public, the Council claimed areas and the whole borough was subject to 'stress factors' in the economy leading to a fall in population, locally and overall in the City of Westminster.

Based on the unfair political considerations, these eight wards took priority in high-visibility services for four years before the 1990 whole-council elections: from street cleaning, pavement repair to planting and environmental improvements.

As Westminster City Council found it more difficult to move homeless people outside Westminster so a revised scheme of the programme strongly favoured the rehousing of the homeless into any of the politically safe wards. In 1989 over 100 homeless families were removed from hostels in marginal wards and placed in the Hermes and Chantry Point tower blocks in the safe Labour ward of Harrow Road. These blocks were "riddled" with asbestos, and should have either been cleaned up or demolished a decade before, but had somehow remained in place due to funding disputes between the Council and the former Greater London Council. The heating and sanitation systems in many of the flats had been destroyed by the council to deter their use as drug dens and others had pigeons making nests out of exposed asbestos-containing fibres. Despite a range of preventative measures some had been taken over by heroin users.

Investigation

Labour councillors and members of the public referred this policy to John Magill (the Audit Commission's District Auditor) to check on its legality, and as a result it was ordered to be halted in 1989 whilst investigations continued.

In 1990, the Conservatives were re-elected by a landslide victory in Westminster, increasing their majority from 4 to 38. They won all but one of the wards targeted by the Building Stable Communities policy. Porter stood down as Leader of the Council in 1991, and served as Lord Mayor of Westminster in 1991–2. She resigned from the council in 1993, and retired to live in Israel with her husband.

On 26 January 1994, Dr. Michael Dutt, joint chairman of Westminster's housing committee between 1988 and 1990 and one of ten councillors facing the surcharge, was found dead from a self-inflicted gunshot wound in his St Albans home, with papers from the investigation by his side.

Legal action

In May 1996, after long investigations, the District Auditor concluded that the 'Building Stable Communities' policy had been illegal. It found ex-leader Dame Shirley Porter guilty of "wilful misconduct" and "disgraceful and improper gerrymandering". Magill ordered Porter, her deputy David Weeks, one other councillor and three council officials "jointly and severally" liable for repaying £36.1m.

The District Auditor's judgement was upheld by the High Court in 1997 with liability reduced solely to Porter and Weeks.  The Court of Appeal overturned the judgement in 1999, but the House of Lords reinstated it in 2001 (see Porter v Magill [2001] UKHL 67, [2002] 2 AC 357). In Israel, Porter transferred substantial parts of her great wealth to other members of her family and into secret trusts in an effort to avoid the charge, and subsequently claimed to have only £300,000 of assets.

On 24 April 2004, Westminster City Council and the Audit Commission announced that an agreement had been reached for a payment of £12.3 million in settlement. The council declared that the cost of legal action would be far greater than the amount to be recovered, while Porter still maintained her innocence. The decision was appealed by Labour members on the Council and the District Auditor began another investigation. The ensuing report, issued on 15 March 2007, accepted the position of the council that further action would not be cost-effective. The Auditor further stated that Westminster had recovered substantially all of Dame Shirley's personal wealth and had acted at all times in the best interests of the taxpayers of the City.

The Labour Party in London continued its pursuit of Porter and following the settlement, Porter returned to Westminster to live, buying a £1.5m flat. The Mayor of London, Ken Livingstone, subsequently requested that Lord Goldsmith (Attorney General) commence an investigation as to whether or not Porter committed perjury or other offences, during the conduct of the case.

Reaction from Westminster City Council

After publication of the District Auditor's final report in 2004, the then leader of Westminster City Council, Simon Milton, apologised for the council's past mistakes. The council's chief executive, Peter Rogers, said it "draws a line under the past".

In 2009, council leader Colin Barrow apologised unreservedly to all those affected by the gerrymandering policy. He criticised Shirley Porter by name for the first time and added that her actions were "the opposite of the council's policies today".

BBC Panorama investigations
The scandal was the subject of two separate "major investigations" by BBC current affairs programme Panorama, broadcast on BBC One on 19 July 1989 and 16 May 1994. The latter was prepared and scheduled for transmission on 25 April 1994 – ahead of the local elections which took place on 5 May 1994, in the period of purdah. Conservative Central Office complained to the BBC and the programme was delayed until after the elections. A Conservative party spokesman denied that they were attempting to censor the BBC and said: "We did point out to the BBC that it seemed curious to us that a programme about a particular London borough is put out 10 days before polling day when London only votes once every four years. We understood it looked into a Conservative borough and not any Labour or Liberal Democrat boroughs."

Peter Bradley, the deputy Leader of the Labour opposition on Westminster council, said: "It is extraordinary that the BBC is pulling the programme as a result of pressure from the Conservative party. If there are fresh revelations, the people of Westminster deserve to know about them before they go to the polls." Jack Straw, the Labour party's shadow environment secretary, said: "This decision smacks of great cowardice by the BBC and of improper pressure by ... ministers and Conservative Central Office."

Cultural depictions
In November 2009 (and repeated in October 2011), BBC Radio 4 broadcast a radio play – Shirleymander – depicting the principal events of Shirley Porter's time as leader of Westminster City Council in the 1980s, in which she was played by Tracy Ann Oberman. In 2018, a stage adaptation starring Jessica Martin opened at the Playground Theatre in North Kensington, west London, ran for several weeks.

See also
Westminster cemeteries scandal
Westminster City Council v Duke of Westminster

References

Further reading

External links